Tickling Giants, directed by Sara Taksler, is a 2017 documentary film about the story of Bassem Youssef. In the midst of the 2011 Egyptian revolution, Bassem Youssef makes a decision to leave his job as a heart surgeon to become a full-time comedian. Dubbed "The Egyptian Jon Stewart," Bassem creates the satirical show Al Bernameg. Tickling Giants follows the team of Al Bernameg as they endure physical threats, protests, and legal action, all because of jokes.

Reception
The documentary has been well received. The review aggregator website Rotten Tomatoes gave it a 100% approval rating, based on 24 reviews. The website's consensus reads, "Tickling Giants offers a powerful demonstration of how satire can influence government policy -- and a sobering warning regarding the double-edged effects of regime change." Metacritic gave it a score of 78 out of 100, based on 11 reviews, indicating "generally favorable reviews". Owen Gleiberman says, "Mostly, the movie makes you understand how every society - and ours more than ever - needs people like Bassem Youssef to demonstrate that laughter will always be one of the essential ways to keep power in check."

See also
 Arab Spring

References

External links
 
 

2017 documentary films
American documentary films
Documentary films about the Arab Spring
Films shot in Egypt
Films shot in London
Films shot in New York City
Documentary films about comedy and comedians
2010s American films